"Don't Fall in Love with a Dreamer" is a song recorded by American singers Kenny Rogers and Kim Carnes, the latter of whom wrote the song with her husband David Ellingson. It was released in March 1980 as the first single from Rogers' album Gideon. It was also recorded in Spanish as "No Te Enamores De Un Loco". The song was the only duet from the album Gideon.

Background
While recording the song in Nashville, Kenny Rogers and Kim Carnes sang facing each other with live musicians while Carnes had to improvise singing the melody in a different key than she had prepared to do when she came to the studio.

Record World said that the singers "exude an awesome emotional intensity" on the song.

Chart performance
The song reached No. 3 on the Billboard Hot Country Singles chart and No. 1 on the RPM Country Tracks chart in Canada.

References

1980 singles
Kenny Rogers songs
Kim Carnes songs
Songs written by Kim Carnes
Song recordings produced by Larry Butler (producer)
United Artists Records singles
Male–female vocal duets
1980 songs